Holden is a French pop duo that began recording in 1997. The band members are Armelle Pioline (vocals) and Dominique Dépret (a.k.a. Mocke, guitar), with help from Pierre-Jean Grapin (drums), Evan Evans (keyboard) and Richard Cousin (bass).

Holden released "L'arrière monde" in 1998. In 2001, they met the producer Señor Coconut a.k.a. Atom a.k.a. Uwe Schmidt, who mixed their second album, 'Pedrolira' (2002). Thanks to him, they became famous in Chile, where they recorded their third album, "Chevrotine" (2006).

Discography

External links
 Holden at Last.fm

French pop music groups
French rock music groups
Musical groups from Paris